Zhao Dengyu or Chao Teng-yu (1898–1937) was a Chinese general, distinguished for his service at the beginning of the
Second Sino-Japanese War.
He was born in a peasant family in Heze, Shandong Province in 1898. He first served as a soldier in the troops commanded by Feng Yuxiang in 1914. After 1922, he distinguished himself on the battlefield and rose through ranks and became successively platoon leader, company commander, battalion commander, regiment commander, brigade commander and division commander. In 1930, he was transferred to be the commander of the 109th Brigade, 37th Division, 29th Army.

On March 8, 1933 during the Defense of the Great Wall, he was ordered to relieve the troops stationed at the Xifengkou Pass on the Great Wall.  On the 10th, he led his troops to launch a night surprise attack on the bivouac of the Japanese troops, in which his troops annihilated hundreds of the Japanese troops, captured over 10 machineguns and burned over 10 Japanese supply-carrying vehicles.  On the 11th, the 109th Brigade was ordered to take a devious route to attack the rear area of the Japanese troops.  In this battle, the Chinese soldiers Killing the Japanese invaders 3000 enemy troops and destroyed 18 enemy artillery pieces.  After the battles at the Great Wall, he was promoted to be commander of the 132nd Division, the 29th Army and led his troops to garrison Chahar.

On July 27, 1937, during the Battle of Beiping-Tianjin, Zhao led an advance regiment to arrive at the headquarters of the 29th Army in Nanyuan, Beijing.  On the morning of the 28th, the main force of the Japanese troops launched a fierce attack against Nanyuan under the fire support of dozens of its fighter planes. Together with Tong Linge, deputy commander of the 29th Army, Zhao directed the troops stationed in Nanyuan to resist the Japanese troops. In this battle his right arm and leg were wounded, yet he still remained at the frontline to command his troops in fight. Later, he was ordered to lead his troops to assemble at Dahongmen, making preparations for counterattack. However, on the way to Dahongmen to the south of the city, he was shot in the chest by Japanese ambush troops and died in action. On July 31, 1937, the Kuomintang government conferred posthumously the rank of army general to him.

Source
 PLA Daily, Zhao Dengyu

National Revolutionary Army generals from Shandong
1898 births
1937 deaths
People from Heze